Jorgo Pëllumbi (born 15 July 2000) is an Albanian professional footballer who plays as a left back for the Croatian club NK Varaždin.

Career

Skënderbeu
Pëllumbi is a graduate of the Skënderbeu youth academy. He made his league debut for the club on 19 May 2018 in a 3-1 away loss to Luftëtari. He was subbed on for Ali Sowe in the 64th minute.

NK Varaždin
In September 2020 Pëllumbi moved, along with his team-mate Agon Elezi, to NK Varaždin in Croatian First Football League.

Career statistics

Club

References

External links
 
 Jorgo Pellumbi profile FSHF.org

2000 births
Living people
Footballers from Korçë
Association football midfielders
Albanian footballers
Albania youth international footballers
Albania under-21 international footballers
KF Skënderbeu Korçë players
NK Varaždin (2012) players
FK Kukësi players
Kategoria Superiore players
First Football League (Croatia) players
Croatian Football League players
Albanian expatriate footballers
Expatriate footballers in Croatia
Albanian expatriate sportspeople in Croatia